Miroslav Vardić (Serbian Cyrillic: Мирослав Вардић; 4 December 1944 – 7 May 2018) was a professional footballer who played as a midfielder. 

In 1975, he played in the National Soccer League with the Serbian White Eagles FC.

Honours
Hajduk Split
 Yugoslav First League: 1970–71

References

External links
 
 
 

1944 births
2018 deaths
Sportspeople from Vushtrri
Kosovo Serbs
Association football midfielders
Canadian National Soccer League players
Eredivisie players
Expatriate footballers in the Netherlands
Expatriate soccer players in Canada
FK Dinamo Vranje players
FK Radnički Niš players
FK Sloga Kraljevo players
Helmond Sport players
HNK Borovo players
HNK Hajduk Split players
NAC Breda players
Serbian footballers
Serbian White Eagles FC players
Sportspeople from Kraljevo
Yugoslav expatriate footballers
Yugoslav expatriate sportspeople in Canada
Yugoslav expatriate sportspeople in the Netherlands
Yugoslav First League players
Yugoslav footballers
Yugoslavia international footballers